Salvatore Curaba (born August 27, 1963 in La Louvière, Belgium) is an entrepreneur and former professional football player. He is the youngest son of 5 of an immigrant family from Italy (Sicily). Married to Patricia since May 1990, they have two children: Céline (born 1993) and Stéphane (born 1995).

Early life 
Salvatore Curaba's parents left Italy for Belgium in 1956. His father worked in the mines of Saint-Vaast, Fontaine l’Évêque and Sainte-Marguerite. After studying Math and Latin in Saint-Joseph school, Salvatore Curaba studied ICT Engineering at ICET Cuemes for 2 years.

Football career (1972–1991)

Royale Association Athlétique Louviéroise 

1972–1982

As many kids of his age, Salvatore was passionate about football. He started playing at Royale Association Athlétique Louviéroise at 9 years old. He made his debut in the first team in 1982 at 19 years old in second division.

82-83: Second Division. Coach: André Gorez

Royal Charleroi Sporting Club 

83-84: Second Division. Coach: Eric Vanlessen

84-85: Second Division. Coach: André Colasse

On 21 June 1985, the RSCS won the « Final Round » and was upgraded in first division.

85-86: First Division. Coach: André Colasse

86-87: First Division. Coach: André Colasse

87-88: RCSC turned professional. Coach: Aimé Anthuenis

At the end of this season, after 70 matched played in First Division, Salvatore Curaba had to choose between a full-time professional football player career or an IT career. He opted for IT but kept playing football for the RAAL (third division).

Royale Association Ahtlétique Louviéroise 

88-89: Third Division. Coach: Casimir Jagiello

89-90: Third Division. Coach: Guy Fromont

Stade Louvain 

90-91: Second Division. Coach: Vince Biganti

Coach formation 
At 27 years old, after few injuries, Salvatore Curaba decided to stop his football career and went for a football coach formation.

91-93: Belgian trainer school (UEFA B Certificate)

IT career (1983–1999)

SBAI 
In 1983, Salvatore Curaba started working at SBAI, an ICT company. He started as a programmer, became an analyst and after 3 years he was a project manager specialized in the hospital sector. While working for SBAI Salvatore was also a professional football player for the Royal Charleroi Sporting Club.

IBS

Sales Rep 
In 1988, after quitting his career as a professional football player for the Royal Charleroi Sporting Club, Salvatore Curaba became Sales representative for the IT company Proget (which will be bought by IBS in 1996).

Sales Manager 
In 1994, Salvatore Curaba had to choose between a career as football coach or keep evolving in the IT sector. He opted for IT and was promoted Sales Manager for IBS. In 1998, after 10 years in this company and a few months before being nominated General Manager for IBS's Brussels offices, Salvatore left the company to found his own IT company, EASI.

Entrepreneurship career (1999-today)

EASI

Founder & Managing Partner 
At the age of 35, Salvatore founded EASI on March 26, 1999 with Christian Castelain. EASI is a Belgian computer services company which offers solutions developed from the latest technology in sectors such as software and mobile applications, infrastructure and cloud computing. In 2012, the company counted 90 employees. This was an important tipping point. After more than 10 years of valuable collaboration between Salvatore Curaba and Christian Castelain, they decided that one person needed to take over the company. Salvatore decided to buy out his partner and became EASI's unique CEO. From this moment, Salvatore managed his company the way he always wanted to: he developed a unique management style based on freedom, share and transparency. His main objective is his company's performances combined to his employee's happiness. Salvatore Curaba has made the choice to regularly sell his company shares to his collaborators. Elected "Best Workplace" of Belgium in 2015 and 2016 and 8th “Best Workplace” in Europe, EASI devotes much attention to the happiness of its 150 employees. Salvatore Curaba has been nominated for the Manager of the Year award by Trends Tendances in 2014 and EASI was nominated for the Enterprise of the Year award 2015 by Ernst & Young.

Football clubs 
In 2015, after more than 30 years away from the football sector, Salvatore Curaba was approached to take over the Royal Albert Elisabeth Club from Mons. The deal was never concluded.

Later in 2015, the Union Royale la Louviere Centre also contacted him to take over the club. These negotiations didn't lead to a deal yet.

Public speaker 
Since 2014, Salvatore Curaba has regularly given speeches and conferences around Belgium, in which he links his former challenges as professional football player with his career as a business man and entrepreneur.

Awards, honors and press 
2014: Nominated for Manager of the year (Trends Tendance)

2015: EASI finalist for Company of the year (EY)

2015: Best Workplace Belgium (Vlerick Business School)

2016: Best Workplace Belgium (Vlerick Business School)

8 Times: Trends Gazelles

References

External links 
http://www.easi.net/

Belgian footballers
Belgian businesspeople
1963 births
Living people
People from La Louvière
Association footballers not categorized by position